Osvaldo Riva (3 November 1927 – 14 April 2004) was an Italian wrestler. He competed in the men's Greco-Roman welterweight at the 1952 Summer Olympics.

References

External links
 

1927 births
2004 deaths
Italian male sport wrestlers
Olympic wrestlers of Italy
Wrestlers at the 1952 Summer Olympics
Sportspeople from Genoa